Haplogroup Q-M120, also known as Q1a1a1, is a Y-DNA haplogroup. It is the only primary branch of haplogroup Q1a1a (F746/NWT01). The lineage is most common amongst modern populations in north-east Eurasia.

Distribution 
Q-M120 has descendants in modern populations across eastern Eurasia.

The Americas

One of the 1K Genomes samples, HG01944, from Peruvians in Lima, Peru belongs to Q-M120. Q-M120 is the other branch under Q-F746. It is best known as an East Asian branch of Q. This is intriguing; if it is not a result of post-colonial admixture, it will mark a fourth or fifth Q lineage in the Americas. The branch of Q-M120 including this sample has a calculated TMRCA of 5,000 to 7,000 years, meaning that it may be the result of a later pre-Columbian immigration from North or East Asia.

Asia
Q-M120 is present in Eastern Asia and may trace its origin to East Asia. It has been found at low frequency in samples of Han Chinese, Dungans, Hmong Daw in Laos, Japanese, Dörwöd Kalmyks, Koreans, Mongols, Tibetans, Uygurs, and Vietnamese. It also has been found among Bhutanese, Murut people in Brunei, and Azerbaijanis. Sengupta et al. (2006) reported finding Q-M120 in the HGDP sample of Pakistani Hazaras, but the Bayesian tree in Supplementary Figure 12 of Lippold et al. (2014) suggests that these HGDP Pakistani Hazara individuals more likely should belong to Q-L275, and that three members of the HGDP Naxi sample and one member of the HGDP Han sample should belong to Q-M120 instead. Di Cristofaro et al. (2013) tested the same sample of Pakistani Hazaras and reported that they belonged to the following Y-DNA haplogroups: 1/25 C-PK2/M386(xM407, M532), 9/25 C-M401, 1/25 I-M223, 1/25 J-M530, 2/25 O-M122(xM134), 1/25 Q-M242(xM120, M25, M346, M378), 1/25 Q-M378, 1/25 R-M124, 8/25 R-M478/M73.

Europe
To date, Q-M120 has not been detected in European populations.

Associated SNPs 
Haplogroup Q-M120 is defined by the presence of the M120 Single Nucleotide Polymorphism (SNP) as well as the M265 (AKA N14) SNP.

Phylogenetic tree 
This is Thomas Krahn at the Genomic Research Center's Draft Tree for haplogroup Q-M120.

 Q-MEH2 MEH2, L472, L528
 Q-M120 M120, N14/M265

See also
Human Y-chromosome DNA haplogroup

Y-DNA Q-M242 subclades

Y-DNA backbone tree

References

External links 
The Y-DNA Haplogroup Q Project

Q-M120